Louis Samson (born 3 July 1995) is a German professional footballer who plays as a midfielder for Hallescher FC.

Career
Samson joined Erzgebirge Aue from Hertha BSC II in June 2015. On 1 June 2017, Eintracht Braunschweig announced the signing of Samson on a two-year contract.

Following his release by Erzgebirge Aue at the of the 2020–21 season, Samson moved to Hallescher FC.

Personal life
He is of Nigerian descent through his father.

References

External links
 
 

Footballers from Berlin
1995 births
Living people
German footballers
German sportspeople of Nigerian descent
Association football midfielders
Hertha BSC II players
FC Erzgebirge Aue players
Eintracht Braunschweig players
Hallescher FC players
3. Liga players
2. Bundesliga players